Afshar (also Romanized as Afshār; also known as Afshāi and Avshār) is a village in Daran Rural District, in the Central District of Jolfa County, East Azerbaijan Province, Iran. At the 2006 census, its population was 231, in 100 families.

References 

Populated places in Jolfa County